Péter Urbin (born 17 September 1984 in Debrecen) is a Hungarian footballer, who plays as a forward for Tiszafüred VSE.

References
HLSZ 

Futball-adattar 

1984 births
Living people
Sportspeople from Debrecen
Hungarian footballers
Association football forwards
Debreceni VSC players
Létavértes SC players
Nyíregyháza Spartacus FC players
Diósgyőri VTK players
Bőcs KSC footballers
Hajdúböszörményi TE footballers
Balmazújvárosi FC players
Dunaújváros PASE players
Szolnoki MÁV FC footballers
Békéscsaba 1912 Előre footballers
Nemzeti Bajnokság I players
Nemzeti Bajnokság II players